Bae Deok-kwang (22 June 1948 – 24 February 2023) was a South Korean accountant and politician. A member of the Saenuri Party, he served in the National Assembly from 2014 to 2018.

Bae died in Busan on 24 February 2023, at the age of 74.

References

1948 births
2023 deaths
South Korean politicians
Members of the National Assembly (South Korea)
Liberty Korea Party politicians
Dong-a University alumni
Kyungsung University alumni
Pusan National University alumni
People from Changwon